Deception is a 2021 French drama film, directed by Arnaud Desplechin, from a screenplay by Desplechin and Julie Peyr. It is based upon the novel of the same name by Philip Roth. It stars Denis Podalydès, Léa Seydoux,  Anouk Grinberg, Emmanuelle Devos, Rebecca Marder and Madalina Constantin.

It had its world premiere at the Cannes Film Festival on 13 July 2021. It was released on 8 December 2021, by Le Pacte.

Cast
 Denis Podalydès as Philip 
 Léa Seydoux as The English Lover
 Anouk Grinberg as Wife
 Emmanuelle Devos as Rosalie
 Rebecca Marder as The Student 
 Madalina Constantin as The Tech

Production
In March 2016, Arnaud Desplechin expressed desire to adapt Deception by Philip Roth, stating: "Perhaps it’s a book that I will never be able to adapt for the screen, and I know I will regret it for the rest of my days." In December 2020, it was announced Léa Seydoux, Denis Podalydès, Emmanuelle Devos and Gennadi Famin had joined the cast of the film, with Desplechin directing from a screenplay he wrote alongside Julie Peyr.

Principal photography began in September 2020.

Release
It had its world premiere at the Cannes Film Festival on 13 July 2021. It released in France on 8 December 2021.

Reception
Deception holds a 53% approval rating on review aggregator website Rotten Tomatoes, based on 19 reviews, with a weighted average of 5.10/10. On Metacritic, the film holds a score of 42 out of 100, based on 10 critics, indicating "mixed or average reviews".

References

External links
 

2021 films
2021 drama films
French drama films
Films based on American novels
Films based on works by Philip Roth
Films directed by Arnaud Desplechin
Films with screenplays by Arnaud Desplechin
2020s French films